Gwyn Williams may refer to:
 Gwyn Williams (football manager), Leeds United's technical director and former manager
 Gwyn Williams (rugby), Welsh rugby union and rugby league footballer of the 1930s

See also
 David Gwyn Williams (1904–1990), Welsh poet, novelist, translator and academic
 Gwyn Alf Williams (1925–1995), Welsh historian